Oskar Piechota (born January 24, 1990) is a Polish mixed martial artist who formerly competed in the Middleweight division of the Ultimate Fighting Championship. A professional competitor since 2011, he has also competed for Cage Warriors where he is the former Middleweight Champion.

Background
Piechota was born in Gdańsk, Poland and has started training in Brazilian Jiu-Jitsu from a young age and transitioned to mixed martial arts when he turned twenty-one.

Mixed martial arts career

Early career
Piechota made his professional debut on March 5, 2011 at Ring XF3, facing Patryk Kania, and won his first professional submission via a triangle choke. He amassed a record of 9-0-1 period signed by UFC and won the Cage Warriors middleweight championship over Jason Radcliffe in 32 seconds on June 24, 2017 in England.

Ultimate Fighting Championship
Piechota made his promotional debut on October 21, 2017 at UFC Fight Night: Cerrone vs. Till against Jonathan Wilson. He won the fight via unanimous decision.

On February 18, 2018, Piechota face  Tim Williams at UFC Fight Night: Cowboy vs. Medeiros.  He won the fight via a knockout in round one.

Piechota next face Gerald Meerschaert on July 6, 2018 at The Ultimate Fighter 27 Finale. He lost the fight via a rear-naked choke in round two.

Piechota faced Rodolfo Vieira on August 10, 2019 at UFC on ESPN+ 14. He lost the fight via a submission in round two.

Piechota faced Punahele Soriano on December 14, 2019 at UFC 245. He lost the fight via knockout in the first round.

Piechota faced Marc-André Barriault on June 20, 2020 at UFC on ESPN: Blaydes vs. Volkov. He lost the fight via technical knockout in round two. Piechota was released from UFC in June after he lost to Barriault.

Piechota received a 22-month suspension after testing positive for growth hormone-releasing peptide 2 (GHRP-2 or pralmorelin) and GHRP-2 (1-3) free acid, a metabolite of GHRP-2 in a sample collected on September 25, 2020. He is eligible to return to competition on July 25, 2022.

Championships and accomplishments

Mixed martial arts
 Cage Warriors
Cage Warriors Middleweight Championship (One time) vs. Jason Radcliffe
MMA Attack
Knockout of the Night (one time)

Personal life
Piechota earned a degree in Physical Education in Poland.

Mixed martial arts record

|-
|NC
|align=center|11–3–1 (1)
|Marc-André Barriault
|NC (overturned)
|UFC on ESPN: Blaydes vs. Volkov
|
|align=center|2
|align=center|4:50
|Las Vegas, Nevada, United States
|
|-
|Loss
|align=center|11–3–1
|Punahele Soriano
|KO (punch)
|UFC 245
|
|align=center|1
|align=center|3:17
|Las Vegas, Nevada, United States
|
|-
|Loss
|align=center|11–2–1
|Rodolfo Vieira
|Submission (arm-triangle choke) 
|UFC Fight Night: Shevchenko vs. Carmouche 2
|
|align=center|2
|align=center|4:26
|Montevideo, Uruguay
|
|-
|Loss
|align=center|11–1–1
|Gerald Meerschaert
|Technical Submission (rear-naked choke)
|The Ultimate Fighter: Undefeated Finale
|
|align=center|2
|align=center|4:55
|Las Vegas, Nevada, United States
|
|-
|Win
|align=center|11–0–1
|Tim Williams
|KO (punches)
|UFC Fight Night: Cowboy vs. Medeiros
|
|align=center|1
|align=center|1:54
|Austin, Texas United States
|
|-
|Win
|align=center|10–0–1
|Jonathan Wilson
|Decision (unanimous)
|UFC Fight Night: Cowboy vs. Till
|
|align=center|3
|align=center|5:00
|Gdańsk, Poland
|
|-
| Win
| align=center| 9–0–1
| Jason Radcliffe
| TKO (punches)
| Cage Warriors 85
| 
| align=center| 1
| align=center| 0:32
| Bournemouth, England
|
|-
| Win
| align=center| 8–0–1
| Sergio Souza
| KO (head kick)
| Spartan Fight 7
| 
| align=center| 1
| align=center|0:37
| Chorzów, Poland
|
|-
| Win
| align=center| 7–0–1
| Nikos Sokolis
| Submission (arm-triangle choke)
| Spartan Fight 6
| 
| align=center| 2
| align=center| 2:47
| Płock, Poland
|
|-
| Win
| align=center| 6–0–1
| Craig White
| Submission (Japanese necktie)
| Time of Masters 1
| 
| align=center| 1
| align=center| 1:17
| Sopot, Poland
|
|-
| Win
| align=center| 5–0–1
| Mattia Schiavolin
| TKO (punches)
| Pro MMA Challenge: Just Fight!
| 
| align=center| 2
| align=center| 3:23
| Lublin, Poland
|
|-
| Win
| align=center| 4–0–1
| Sadibou Sy
| Submission (triangle choke)
| International Ring Fight Arena 6
| 
| align=center| 2
| align=center| N/A
| Stockholm, Sweden
|
|-
| Draw
| align=center| 3–0–1
| Rafał Haratyk
| Draw (split)
| No Contest 1
| 
| align=center| 3
| align=center| 5:00
| Kwidzyn, Poland
|
|-
| Win
| align=center| 3–0
| Livio Victoriano
| KO (punch)
| MMA Attack 3
| 
| align=center| 2
| align=center| 1:50
| Katowice, Poland
|
|-
| Win
| align=center| 2–0
| Michał Tarabańka
| Submission (guillotine choke)
| Battle in the Cage: Young Blood
| 
| align=center| 1
| align=center| 0:40
| Słupsk, Poland
|
|-
| Win
| align=center| 1–0
| Patryk Kania
| Submission (triangle choke)
| Ring XF 3: Podwójne Uderzenie
| 
| align=center| 1
| align=center| 0:56
| Zgierz, Poland
|
|-

See also 
 List of male mixed martial artists

References

External links 
 
 

1990 births
Living people
Polish male mixed martial artists
Middleweight mixed martial artists
Mixed martial artists utilizing Brazilian jiu-jitsu
Sportspeople from Gdańsk
Ultimate Fighting Championship male fighters
People awarded a black belt in Brazilian jiu-jitsu
Polish practitioners of Brazilian jiu-jitsu
Doping cases in mixed martial arts
Polish sportspeople in doping cases